The Lepidoptera of Kuwait consist of both the butterflies and moths recorded from Kuwait.

According to a recent estimate, there are a total of about 76 Lepidoptera species present in Kuwait.

Butterflies

Nymphalidae
Vanessa cardui (Linnaeus, 1758)

Moths

Crambidae
Amselia heringi (Amsel, 1935)
Pediasia numidellus (Rebel, 1903)

Noctuidae
Acontia biskrensis − Oberthür, 1887
Caradrina clavipalpis − (Scopoli, 1763)

References

Lists of butterflies by location
Lists of moths by country
lepidoptera
Lepidoptera by country

lepidoptera